7th Legions Infantry Regiment (Polish language: 7 Pulk Piechoty Legionow, 7 pp Leg.) was an infantry regiment of the Polish Army. It existed from 1918 until 1939. Garrisoned first in Ostrów Mazowiecka and then in Chełm, it was part of the 3rd Legions Infantry Division.

The regiment was formed on May 1, 1918, in the centers of Polska Siła Zbrojna at Ostrów Mazowiecka and Zegrze. The new unit, which at that time was called 1st Infantry Regiment consisted of three infantry battalions and a company of machine guns. In November 1918, its soldiers disarmed German garrisons of Warsaw, Ostrów Mazowiecka and Malkinia. In early February 1919, the regiment was renamed the 7th Legions Infantry Regiment, to fight in the Polish–Soviet War.

In the Second Polish Republic, the 7th Legions Infantry Regiment was stationed in the garrison of Chełm, as part of the 3rd Legions Infantry Division. On September 24, 1933, during a special ceremony attended by President Ignacy Mościcki and General Felicjan Sławoj Składkowski, a monument dedicated to the soldiers of the regiment killed in the wars of 1918–1920 was unveiled in Chełm.

Commandants 
 Colonel Karol Udalowski (1 V 1918 – 16 III 1920) 
 Colonel Zdzislaw Mackowski (since 17 VII 1920) 
 Colonel Michal Micewicz 
 Colonel Mieczyslaw Wieckowski (XI 1925 – † 13 V 1926) 
 Colonel Stanislaw Borowiec (X 1926 – VI 1930) 
 Colonel Stanislaw Dabek (VI 1930–1937) 
 Colonel Wladyslaw Muzyka

Symbols 
On September 22, 1921, in Podbrodzie, the anniversary of the Battle of Brzostowica, Colonel Władysław Bończa-Uzdowski handed the flag to the regiment. It was funded by the Association of Landowners of the Land of Chełm, and the ceremony was attended by Bishop Wladyslaw Bandurski.

The badge, approved in 1928, was in the shape of the cross, with the 1916 Eagle of the Polish Legions and the initials 7 PPL.

Sources 
 Kazimierz Satora: Opowieści wrześniowych sztandarów. Warszawa: Instytut Wydawniczy Pax, 1990
 Zdzisław Jagiełło: Piechota Wojska Polskiego 1918–1939. Warszawa: Bellona, 2007

See also 
 1939 Infantry Regiment (Poland)

Infantry regiments of Poland
Military units and formations established in 1918
Military units and formations disestablished in 1939
Military units and formations of Poland in World War II
Polish Legions in World War I